Alex Knaff (born 26 November 1997) is a Luxembourgish tennis player.

Knaff has a career high ATP singles ranking of 597 achieved on 07 November 2022. He also has a career high ATP doubles ranking of 435 achieved on 26 September 2022.

Knaff represents Luxembourg at the Davis Cup since 2015, where he has a W/L record of 10–9.

Knaff played college tennis at Florida State University.

Future and Challenger finals

Singles 2 (1–1)

Doubles 8 (4–3)

References

External links
 
 
 

1997 births
Living people
Luxembourgian male tennis players
Sportspeople from Luxembourg City
Florida State Seminoles men's tennis players